Sir Walter Butler, 1st Baronet (died 1650) was an Irish nobleman. He was created a baronet, of Polestown, in the Baronetage of Ireland on 8 July 1645.

Family
Sir Walter Butler was son of Edmond Butler of Polestown (died 21 April 1636) and descendant of James Butler, 3rd Earl of Ormond, belonging to the Polestown branch of the Butler family.  He married Elizabeth Butler, daughter of Richard Butler, 3rd Viscount Mountgarret and Margaret O'Neill, likewise a descendant of James Butler, 3rd Earl of Ormond. They had issue Sir Richard Butler, 2nd Baronet Polestown (d. c. 1679).

He held the office of Governor of Kilkenny on 28 March 1650, when it surrendered to Cromwell.

Polestown, also known as Poulstown,  is today called Paulstown and is located in County Kilkenny.

See also
 Butler baronets
 Butler dynasty

References

External links
 Butlers of Polestown.

Walter
17th-century Irish people
Year of birth uncertain
1650 deaths
Baronets in the Baronetage of Ireland